Kurov is a Russian male surname, its feminine counterpart is Kurova. Notable people with the surname include:

Nataliya Kurova (born 1962), Russian speed skater

See also
Kirov (surname)

Russian-language surnames